Mar Thoma V was the 5th Malankara Metropolitan from 1728 to 8 May 1765. He was born as Ousep (Yossef in Hebrew, Ousep-Malayalam, Joseph in English) to the Pakalomattom family, one of the oldest families in Kerala. His tenure faced numerous challenges and conflicts with bishops sent from the Syriac Orthodox Patriarchate in Antioch, resulting in some of these Syriac bishops being banished from the country and forced to return.

Introduction
On the South Western coast of India lies a small state known as Kerala It was here in the first century, Thomas the Apostle arrived to preach the gospel to the Jewish community. Some of the Jews and locals became followers of Jesus of Nazareth. They were known as Malabar Nasrani people and their church as Malankara Church.  They followed a unique Hebrew-Syriac Christian tradition which included several Jewish elements and Indian customs.

The Malayalam versions of the Canons of the Synod of Diamper use these titles throughout the report except in three places where they use the Latin word archidiaconus. 

After the great swearing in 1653 it became necessary to appoint a bishop and Thoma 1 was consecrated. Thus began the period of Malankara Metropolitans with the title Marthoma.

Consecration
By 1727, Thoma IV fell sick. So the leaders of the Malankara Church selected a successor for him. He was consecrated as Mar Thoma V.

On 24 March 1728, Mar Thoma IV died and Mar Thoma V, took charge as the Malankara Metropolitan. He made Kandanad (Pallikara Palli) his headquarters.

Arrival of foreign bishops
Ivanios a bishop from Antioch arrived in 1748. He lived in Mulanthuruthy Church and taught Syriac to the deacons. Abraham and Geevarghese of Kattumangattu family were his students.  It was found that his teachings were unacceptable to the Malankara church and so in 1751 he was banished from Kerala. Before leaving for Antioch in 1751, Ivanios ordained Kattumangattu Abraham and Geevarghese as priests. They later became the founder fathers of Malabar Independent Syrian Church.

The Dutch East India Company (Vereenigde Oost-Indische Compagnie or VOC in old-spelling Dutch, literally "United East Indian Company") was established in 1602. They attached Cochin and the king of Cochin surrendered to the Dutch on 20 March 1663. During the time of Thoma V they were in control of Cochin and the surrounding areas. Thoma requested the help of the Dutch company to bring a bishop from outside and agreed to pay the passage.

Ignatious Geevarghese III, patriarch of Antioch heard about this and immediately sent Baselios Shakralla, Gregorios, Ramban Yuhanon, Geevarghese Corepiscopa, Yuhanon Kassessa and four other priests. They arrived at Cochin in 1751. Thoma sent priests to receive them. They were expecting one or two visitors, but there were nine. Their passage came up to Rs. 12 ,000. Neither the Church nor Thoma could pay that much. Dutch wouldn't allow them to disembark without payment. In the end Thoma was put in jail. Hearing this, Niranam Church under the leadership of a Kathanar began to collect money. After three months, with all the collections they were able to pay part of the amount and the Dutch released Thoma and the bishops. Thoma never tried to meet these visitors. But they insisted that Thoma should receive their Kaiveppu (laying of hands) and change his name from Mar Thoma to Dionysius. Thoma V, refused to comply.
 
In 1754, they made an agreement with Thoma V, not to ordain priests in Malankara Syrian Church.

Last days
In 1761, Mar Thoma V consecrated Mar Thoma VI as his successor. He did it without any assistance from foreign Bishops thus severing all allegiance to foreign bishops.

Mar Thoma V, died on 8 May 1765 at Niranam and was laid to rest at Niranam Palli. The funeral service was conducted by Mar Thoma VI.

See also
 Malankara Jacobite Syriac Orthodox Church
 Malankara Orthodox Syrian Church
 Mar Thoma Syrian Church of Malabar
 List of Catholicoi of the East and Malankara Metropolitans

References

Further reading
Chacko, T. C. (1936). Malankara Marthoma Sabha Charithra Samgraham (Concise History of Marthoma Church), Pub: E.J. Institute, Kompady, Tiruvalla.
Danil, K. N. (1952). Udayamperoor Sunnahadosinte Canonukal (Canons of the Synod of Diamper), CLS. Tiruvalla.
Eapen, Prof. Dr. K. V. (2001). Malankara Marthoma Suryani Sabha Charitram (History of Malankara Marthoma Syrian Church). Pub: Kallettu, Muttambalam, Kottayam.
Ittoop Writer (1906). Malayalathulla Suryani Chistianikauleday Charitram (History of Syrian Christians in the land of Malayalam).
Kochumon, M. P. (1995). Parisuddha Kattumangattu Bavamar (Saintly bishops of Kattumangattu). Pub.Joseph Mar Kurilos.
Mathew, N. M. Malankara Marthoma Sabha Charitram, (History of the Marthoma Church), Volume 1 (2006), Volume II (2007), Volume III (2008). Pub. E.J.Institute, Thiruvalla.
Varghese Kassessa, K. C. (1972). Malabar Swathantra suyani sabha Charitram. (History of Malabar Independent Syrian Church). Pub. Malabar Independent Syrian Church.

Oriental Orthodoxy in India
People from Pathanamthitta district
Indian bishops
Pakalomattam family
1765 deaths
Year of birth unknown
Syriac Orthodox Church bishops
Malankara Orthodox Syrian Church bishops